Christopher Budd may refer to:

 Christopher Budd (mathematician) (born 1960), British mathematician
 Christopher Budd (cricketer) (born 1978), former English cricketer
 Christopher Budd (bishop) (born 1937), British Roman Catholic prelate